Chantal Chawaf (born 1943) is a French writer.

Biography 
Chawaf was born in Paris during World War II. After studying art and literature at l'École du Louvre, she married and lived in Damascus for seven years where she had two children. She also traveled and lived for some years in Europe and North America.

In 1974, she published, her first book, with Editions des Femmes, the feminist press created by activists in the MLF (Mouvement de Liberation des Femmes) centered around French feminist Antoinette Fouque. Chawaf’s first book, Retable, la rêverie, started what critics called "Écriture féminine", along with the works of Hélène Cixous, Catherine Clément, Julia Kristeva, and Luce Irigaray. Other key texts by Chawaf include Cercoeur (1975) and Maternité (1979).

In her books, Chawaf explores the mother-daughter relationship and attempts to realize the potential of words to free the female unconscious, to de-intellectualize the body and to give voice to an inner experience.
Chantal Chawaf's work on birth and life-giving leads, in her last decade books, to an eco-critique of contemporary society (Melusine des détritus).

She has traveled frequently in the United States where her work has been translated and studied.
She also edited a collection at a publishing house in Paris from 2000 to 2010.

Bibliography 

Retable. La rêverie, 1974, Editions des femmes
Cercœur, 1975, Mercure de France
Chair chaude (théâtre, essay), 1976, Mercure de France
Blé de semence, 1976, Mercure de France
Le Soleil et la Terre, 1977, Editions Jean-Jacques Pauvert
Rougeâtre, 1978, Editions Jean-Jacques Pauvert
Maternité, 1979, Editions Stock
Landes, 1980, Editions Stock
Crépusculaires, 1981, Editions Ramsay
Les Surfaces de l'orage, 1982, Editions Ramsay
La Vallée incarnate, 1984, Editions Flammarion
Elwina, le roman fée, 1985, Editions Flammarion
Fées de toujours (with Jinane Chawaf), 1987, Editions Plon
L'intérieur des heures, 1987, Editions des femmes
Rédemption, 1988, Editions Flammarion
L'éclaircie, 1990, Editions Flammarion
Vers la lumière, 1994, Editions des femmes
Le Manteau noir, 1998, Editions Flammarion, republished as Je suis née, 2010, Editions des femmes
Issa, 1999, Editions Flammarion
 Under the pseudonym Marie de la Montluel : Mélusine des détritus, 2002, Editions du Rocher
L'Ombre, 2004, Editions du Rocher
La Sanction, 2004, Editions des Femmes
Sable noir, 2005, Editions du Rocher
Infra- monde, 2005, Editions des Femmes
 Les Obscures, 2008, Editions des Femmes
 Je suis née, 2010, Editions des Femmes, augmented republishing of le Manteau noir
 Syria, le désert d'une passion, 2012, Editions Ixcea
 Délivrance brisée, 2013, Éditions de la Grande Ourse
 Ne quitte pas les vivants, 2015, Éditions Des femmes -Antoinette Fouque
 L'inconnue du désir, 2017, Éditions de la Grande Ourse
Relégation, Éditions Des femmes - Antoinette Fouque, 2019

Non fictional writings 

Le corps et le verbe, la langue en sens inverse (essay), 1992, Presses de la Renaissance
L'Erotique des mots, with Régine Deforges, 2004, Editions du Rocher
L'identité inachevée, with Adonis, 2004, Editions du Rocher

Translated books 

Redemption, translated by Monique F. Nagem, 1992, Dalkey Archive Press
 Mother Love, Mother Earth, translated by M. F. Nagem, 1993, Garland Publishing
 Warmth: a bloodsong in "Plays by French and Francophone Women", translated by par C.P. Makward et J.G. Miller, 1994, University of Michigan Press: 233-246
 Fées de Toujours, with Jinane Chawaf ; translated in Arabic by Samia Esber, 2000, Ministère de la Culture de Syrie, Damas

References

Further reading 

Marianne Bosshard, Chantal Chawaf (Rodopi, 1999)
Rodgers, Catherine,Gender in Modern France: Society in Transition - edited by Malcolm Cook, Grace Davie (Routledge, 1999)
Monique Saigal, Ecriture: Lien De Mère a Fille Chez Jeanne Hyvrard, Chantal Chawaf et Annie Ernaux, (Rodopi, 2000)
Robson, Kathryn,"The female vampire: Chantal Chawaf's melancholic Autofiction" in "Women's writing in contemporary France: New Writers, New Literatures in the 1990s", directed by Rye, Gill & Worton, Michael; (Manchester University Press, 2002)
Coward, David, History of French Literature: From Chanson de Geste to Cinema;(Blackwell Publishing, 2003)
 Vicki Mistacco, Les Femmes et la tradition littéraire- 2eme partie , Yale University, 2006
 Frédérique Chevillot and Anna Norris, Des Femmes écrivent la guerre, Editions complicité, 2007
 Collectif, Génération MLF 1968-2008 , Ed. des Femmes- Antoinette Fouque, 2008
  Jonathan Krell, "Mélusine des Détritus ou les cris de la terre" , in "Ecriture et réécriture du merveilleux féerique", directed by Matthew Morris et Jean-Jacques Vincensini, Classiques Garnier, Paris (2012)

External links 
Chantal Chawaf resource page

1943 births
Living people
Writers from Paris
20th-century French novelists
21st-century French novelists
Feminist theorists
French feminists
20th-century French women